Ryan O'Meara (born January 5, 1984, Houston, Texas) is an American ice dancer. With partner Jamie Silverstein, he is a 2006 Olympian. Following his retirement from competitive skating, he began working full-time as a coach and an interior designer.

Career 
O'Meara competed on the novice and junior levels with Melissa Ralph and Lia Nitake, having some success with them both. He won four straight medals at the U.S. Championships on the novice and junior levels between 1999 and 2002, two with Ralph and two with Nitake. He competed with Lydia Manon from 2003 to 2005. With Manon, he won the bronze medal at the 2005 U.S. Championships and at the 2005 Four Continents, following which Manon decided to end the partnership.

He began training with Jamie Silverstein, a former World Junior Champion with Justin Pekarek, in April 2005. They were coached by Igor Shpilband and Marina Zueva in Canton, Michigan. Silverstein and O'Meara had sudden success. They were sent as a host entry to the 2005 Skate America, their first international competition together as a team, and placed 5th.

They won the bronze medal at the 2006 U.S. Championships, which qualified them for the 2006 Winter Olympics and the 2006 Four Continents Championships. They competed at the Four Continents and placed 6th.

At the Olympics, they placed  18th in the compulsory dance, 16th in the original dance, and 18th in the free dance, placing 16th overall out of 23 teams. They chose not to compete at the 2006 World Championships. U.S. pewter medalists Morgan Matthews and Maxim Zavozin were sent in their place.

In the spring of 2006, Silverstein and O'Meara announced they would be taking time off from competitive skating. Their partnership ended soon after and O'Meara retired from competitive skating.

Personal life 
O'Meara works as a coach. He owns an interior design business called "Palavela Home", which is named after the Palavela, the venue for the figure skating competition at the Olympics.

O'Meara is openly gay.

Competitive highlights

With Silverstein

With Manon

With Ralph

With Nitake

Programs 
(with Silverstein)

(with Manon)

References

External links
O'Meara's interior design company
Official Silverstein/O'Meara Website
 
 
 
 U.S. Olympic Team bio

1984 births
American male ice dancers
Figure skaters at the 2006 Winter Olympics
Living people
Olympic figure skaters of the United States
American LGBT sportspeople
Gay sportsmen
LGBT figure skaters
Four Continents Figure Skating Championships medalists
Sportspeople from Houston
LGBT people from Texas
Sportspeople from Scottsdale, Arizona
LGBT people from Arizona
LGBT dancers